Churchville is an unincorporated community in Lewis County, West Virginia, United States.

Churchville was so named on account of the churches near the town site.

References 

Unincorporated communities in West Virginia
Unincorporated communities in Lewis County, West Virginia